Cinema has always been one of the most popular forms of entertainment in the city of Delhi, India. Therefore, movie theatres are major entertainment venues in the city, and have been prominent in the nation's movie theatre industry. In recent years Delhi's many single-screen cinema halls have been giving way to large multiplexes.

History

Regal single-screen movie theatre this is oldest movie theatre of delhi. it was started in 1932 and This movie theater in 2017 permanently closed.

Single-screen theatres

Multiplexes

4DX

See also 
 Cinema in Kolkata

References

Culture of Delhi
Delhi
Cinemas